Inverness, Nairn, Badenoch and Strathspey is a constituency of the House of Commons of the UK Parliament. As with all seats since 1955 it elects one Member of Parliament (MP) by the first past the post system of election.

The seat covers a broad south-eastern portion of the Highland council area. It has four locations in its name, the most nationwide.

Boundaries 

The constituency was created in 2005 by merging an area from Inverness East, Nairn and Lochaber with an area from  Ross, Skye and Inverness West. The rest of Inverness East, Nairn and Lochaber was merged with most of the rest of Ross, Skye and Inverness West to form Ross, Skye and Lochaber. A small area of Ross, Skye and Inverness West was merged into Caithness, Sutherland and Easter Ross.

For representation in the Scottish Parliament (Holyrood) the area is divided between Inverness and Nairn and part of Skye, Lochaber and Badenoch.

Local government area 
See also Politics of the Highland council area
The Inverness, Nairn, Badenoch and Strathspey constituency is one of three Westminster constituencies covering the Highland council area, the other two being Ross, Skye and Lochaber and Caithness, Sutherland and Easter Ross. Inverness, Nairn, Badenoch and Strathspey covers a south-eastern portion of the council area, with Ross, Skye and Lochaber to its north and west, and Caithness, Sutherland and Easter Ross further north.

When created in 2005, the Inverness, Nairn, Badenoch and Strathspey constituency covered 31 out of the 80 wards of the council area: 22 wards (all except Beauly and Strathglass) of the Inverness area committee, all four wards of the Nairn area committee and all five wards of the Badenoch and Strathspey area committee. Following ward boundary changes in 2007, the constituency covers all 5 Inverness wards, Culloden & Ardersier, Nairn and Badenoch & Strathspey. It contains part of Ard & Loch Ness and a few corners of Caol & Mallaig, Fort William & Ardnamurchan and Wester Ross, Strathpeffer & Lochalsh.

The City of Inverness, for which letters patent were granted in 2001, may be supposed to lie within the Inverness, Nairn, Badenoch and Strathspey constituency, but this city lacks clearly defined boundaries. The Highland Council management area of Inverness, as defined 1996 to 2007, included the former burgh of Inverness, as abolished in 1975, and the urban area centred on the burgh, and these do lie within the constituency. The management area included also a large rural area. As of 2007, the council has a city management area consisting of seven of the nine wards of its Inverness, Nairn and Badenoch and Strathspey corporate management area. The boundaries of his city management are similar to those of the older management area.

Members of Parliament

Election results

Elections in the 2010s

Elections in the 2000s
 ''Note: The constituency was new in 2005 and +/- percentages are notional.

See also 
 Opinion polling for the next United Kingdom general election in individual constituencies

References 

Westminster Parliamentary constituencies in Scotland
Constituencies of the Parliament of the United Kingdom established in 2005
Highland constituencies, UK Parliament